Allan Victor Horwitz (born August 22, 1948) is an American sociologist who is Board of Governors Professor in the Department of Sociology and Institute for Health, Health Care Policy, and Aging Research at Rutgers University. His previous positions at Rutgers include Chair of the Department of Sociology and Dean for Behavioral and Social Sciences in the School of Arts and Sciences. He has also chaired the Mental Health and Medical Sociology Sections of the American Sociological Association, as well as the Psychiatric Sociology Section of the Society for the Study of Social Problems. His research has focused on the sociology of mental health and illness. He was a fellow-in-residence at the Netherlands Institute for Advanced Study in 2007–2008 and a fellow of the Center for Advanced Study in the Behavioral Sciences at Stanford University in 2012–13. In 2006, he received the Leonard I. Pearlin Award for Distinguished Contributions to the Sociological Study of Mental Health from the American Sociological Association's Section on Sociology of Mental Health.

References

External links
Faculty page

Living people
1948 births
People from Minneapolis
American sociologists
Medical sociologists
Rutgers University faculty
Center for Advanced Study in the Behavioral Sciences fellows
Dickinson College alumni
Yale University alumni